Bharani is an Indian actor who has appeared in Tamil language films. After making his debut in Balaji Sakthivel's college drama Kalloori (2007), he made a breakthrough with his role as an eccentric Madurai-based youngster in Samuthirakani's buddy film Naadodigal (2009). He has since appeared in leading and supporting roles in films including Thoonga Nagaram (2011) and Netru Indru (2014).

Career
Bharani made his acting debut through Balaji Sakthivel's coming-of-age college drama Kalloori (2009), where he played a supporting role alongside Tamannaah and Akhil. The film, produced by Shankar, won critical acclaim and created further offers for the leading actors. Bharani was then cast in Samuthirakani's buddy movie Naadodigal (2009), where he featured as an eccentric Madurai-based youngster along with Sasikumar and Vijay Vasanth. Bharani won critical acclaim for his performance, with Rediff.com noting "it is Bharani who takes the cake as the perfect friend" and that "he has you in splits throughout with his comic expressions and dialogues". The film performed well at the box office and presented further offers for several of the film's cast and crew. Soon after the release of the film, Bharani was offered leading roles in films including Seenu Ramasamy's Thenmerku Paruvakaatru (2009) and Prabhu Solomon's Mynaa (2010), but missed out on the opportunities. During the period, he also worked on his first lead role in Vilai (2010), before starring in Gaurav Narayanan's Thoonga Nagaram (2011) in a supporting role with Vimal. Bharani also worked on films including Parimala Thiraiyarangam, Vellai Kuthirayil Rajakumaran and Podi Pasanga thereafter, though none of the films were completed. He made his Malayalam debut with Vasanthathinte Kanal Vazhikalil (2014). Commercial success eluded the actor during the following years with Netru Indru (2014) being critically panned and another film as the lead actor, Kannakkol, going through production delays, before eventually releasing in 2018.

In 2017, Bharani appeared in the reality TV show Bigg Boss, hosted by Kamal Haasan. He was ejected from the house after 14 days after attempting to scale a wall to exit the premises. His exit brought about much criticism and media  following allegations of bullying from other housemates. Since his exit, Bharani has enjoyed wider media attention and has been presented in positive light, in contrary to negative allegations he endured against him inside the house.

Filmography 
All films are in Tamil, unless otherwise noted.

Television

References

Living people
Male actors from Tamil Nadu
Indian male film actors
Male actors in Tamil cinema
Indian male comedians
Tamil comedians
People from Ramanathapuram district
1986 births
Bigg Boss (Tamil TV series) contestants